Sean Brackett (born November 3, 1991) is a former American football quarterback and current quarterbacks coach for the Massachusetts Pirates of the Indoor Football League (IFL). He played college football at Columbia University.

Early life
A two-sport letterman at Griswold High School in Griswold, Connecticut, Brackett played football and basketball. As a senior in 2008, Brackett was named First team All-Eastern Connecticut Conference as a quarterback. Brackett was a Class M All-Academic selection as a senior in 2009 on the basketball team.

College career
In December 2008, Brackett was accepted to Columbia University to be a member of the varsity football team.

Statistics

Source:

Professional career
Brackett was rated the 77th best quarterback in the 2013 NFL Draft by NFLDraftScout.com.

Utah Blaze
In August 2013, Brackett was assigned to the Utah Blaze of the Arena Football League. However, in October 2013, the Blaze did not submit paperwork to return to the AFL, making Brackett a free agent again.

Las Vegas Outlaws
On October 28, 2014, Brackett was assigned to the Las Vegas Outlaws. He was named the backup to J. J. Raterink, for the 2015 season. After Raterink went down in Week 9, Brackett was named the starting quarterback for the Outlaws.

Jacksonville Sharks
On October 16, 2015, Brackett was assigned to the Jacksonville Sharks. He was the backup to Tommy Grady during the 2016 season.

Qingdao Clipper
Bracket was selected by the Qingdao Clipper in the 21st round of the 2016 CAFL Draft and was the backup to Bryan Randall during the 2016 season. On October 29, 2016, Brackett relieved Randall and completed 5 of 5 passes for 102 yards and 2 touchdowns as the Clipper lost to the Shenzhen Naja by a score of 47–40. He is listed on the Clipper's roster for the 2018 season.

Washington Valor
Brackett was assigned to the Washington Valor on March 1, 2017. Brackett was activated on May 24, 2017, from injured reserve. On May 27, 2017, Brackett made his first start for the Valor and led the team to a 48–47 defeat.

Massachusetts Pirates
Brackett signed with the Massachusetts Pirates on January 27, 2018. During the 2018 season Brackett won the NAL Most Valuable Player Award and was named 2nd-Team All-NAL, while passing for 3,170 yards with 74 Touchdowns and 18 Interceptions. In 2019 he passed for 2,523 yards with 57 Touchdowns and 15 Interceptions, while being named 2nd-Team All-NAL. The 2020 NAL season was cancelled due to the COVID-19 virus. Brackett re-signed with the Pirates for the 2021 season, which was the team's first after moving leagues to the IFL.

AFL statistics

NAL statistics

Stats from ArenaFan:

IFL statistics

Coaching career 
Sean accepted the position of Head Coach for the Waltham (MA) High School Hawks varsity football team in May of 2021. In 2022, Brackett accepted an offer to become the quarterbacks  coach of the Massachusetts Pirates.

References

External links

Columbia Lions bio
Arena Football bio

Living people
1991 births
American football quarterbacks
Columbia Lions football players
Utah Blaze players
Las Vegas Outlaws (arena football) players
Jacksonville Sharks players
Qingdao Clipper players
Washington Valor players
Players of American football from Connecticut
People from Windham County, Connecticut
Massachusetts Pirates players
People from North Providence, Rhode Island
Sportspeople from Providence County, Rhode Island